
Końskie County is a unit of territorial administration and local government (powiat) in Świętokrzyskie Voivodeship, central Poland. It came into being on January 1, 1999, as a result of the Polish local government reforms passed in 1998.

As of 2019 its total population is 77,019, out of which the population of Końskie is 19,176, that of Stąporków is 5,639, and the rural population is 52,204.

Neighbouring counties
Końskie County is bordered by Opoczno County to the north, Przysucha County to the north-east, Szydłowiec County and Skarżysko County to the east, Kielce County to the south, Włoszczowa County to the south-west, and Radomsko County to the west.

Administrative division
The county is subdivided into eight gminas (two urban-rural and six rural). These are listed in the following table, in descending order of population.

References

 
Land counties of Świętokrzyskie Voivodeship